Yamaguchi Dam is an earthfill dam located in Fukuoka Prefecture in Japan. The dam is used for irrigation and water supply. The catchment area of the dam is 3.7 km2. The dam impounds about 10  ha of land when full and can store 800 thousand cubic meters of water. The construction of the dam was started on 1970 and completed in 1996.

References

Dams in Fukuoka Prefecture
1996 establishments in Japan